Wong Shiu Chi Secondary School is a Hong Kong secondary school located in Tai Po. Founded in 1960 by Dr. Wong Tak Haen, the school is named after her father Wong Shiu Tuen and mother Lai Tan Chi.

References

External links 
 

Protestant secondary schools in Hong Kong
Educational institutions established in 1960
Tai Po